Riccardo Saponara (born 21 December 1991) is an Italian professional footballer who plays as an attacking midfielder for Serie A club Fiorentina.

Club career

Ravenna
Born in Forlì to parents from Palazzo San Gervasio, Basilicata, Southern Italy, Saponara started his professional career at Ravenna. In January 2009, he was signed by Empoli in a co-ownership deal for €700,000. In June 2010, Saponara was signed by Empoli outright for another €550,000.

Empoli and Milan
Originally played as a winger, Empoli manager Maurizio Sarri switched him into a central position behind the strikers in the 2012–13 Serie B season to devastating effect as he grabbed 13 goals and 15 assists in 40 appearances for the club. He led Empoli to the Serie B promotion play-off finals where they lost to Livorno.

In January 2013, Milan signed the 21-year-old Saponara from Empoli on the condition that he remained at Empoli until the end of the season. Milan paid €3.75 million for his co-ownership on a -year contract, which Parma signed Empoli's half for €2.6 million in summer 2013. He played just 218 minutes of Serie A football spread across seven league games, failing to contribute any goals or assists in the 2013–14 season. In June 2014, Milan acquired Parma's half for just €1 million.

Return to Empoli
On 16 January 2015, Saponara returned to Empoli with the formula of the loan with the right of redemption. He made his comeback for the club four days later in Roma - Empoli 2–1 in Coppa Italia. He made comeback in the league ten days later in Empoli's 1–2 defeat to Udinese, opening the scoring with a penalty kick; his first goal in Serie A and his second during his experience in Tuscany. On 22 March 2015, he scored his first brace in a 3–1 home win over Sassuolo. On 13 May, his contract was redeemed by Empoli for a reported €4 million.

Fiorentina 
On 28 January 2017, Saponara was loaned to Fiorentina until the end of the season with an obligation to buy him out at the end of the loan deal.

Loan to Sampdoria
On 17 August 2018, Saponara joined Sampdoria on a one-year loan from Fiorentina. The deal included an option to purchase.

After Saponara scored a game tying goal against Lazio on 18 December 2018, he gained notoriety when he was celebrating with his teams' fans, his shorts fell down and the supporters also pulled down his briefs, which exposed his rear.

Loan to Genoa
On 7 August 2019, Saponara joined Genoa on loan with an option to buy.

Loan to Lecce
On 22 January 2020, Saponara joined Lecce on loan from Genoa.

Loan to Spezia
On 5 January 2021, Saponara joined Spezia on loan from Fiorentina.

International career
Saponara made his debut with the Italy under-21 national team on 8 February 2011, in a 1–0 win over England. He scored his first goal for the under-21 side on 13 April, in a 2–0 win over Russia. Saponara was chosen by former manager Ciro Ferrara to take part in the Toulon Tournament in May 2011, where he appeared in all of Italy's matches, helping the team to win a Bronze medal. He was also elected to take part at the 2013 UEFA European Under-21 Championship with Italy, under manager Devis Mangia, and he scored a goal in Italy's second group match against hosts Israel, in a 4–0 win, which qualified the Italians for the semi-final. Saponara made three appearances throughout the tournament, helping Italy to reach the final, where they were defeated 4–2 by Spain. Overall, between 2011 and 2013, he has collected 22 appearances, scoring three goals for the "azzurrini".

Style of play
A talented attacking midfielder, Saponara is a creative playmaker, who is also capable of playing on the wing (preferably on the right flank), or as a central midfielder in the mezzala role. A strong, fast, and hardworking player, with good technical ability, he is known for his dribbling skills and balance on the ball, as well as his determination, defensive contribution, eye for the final pass, and ability to time his attacking runs, which allow to both score and create goals. His style of play and precocious performances as a youngster during his time in Serie B drew occasional comparisons to his idol Kaká.

At the conclusion of the 2020–21 Serie A season, Saponara held the record for the fastest sprint in the league clocked at 36.04 km/h.

Career statistics

References

External links
Profile at the ACF Fiorentina website 

1991 births
Living people
People from Forlì
Italian footballers
Association football midfielders
Italy youth international footballers
Italy under-21 international footballers
Serie A players
Serie B players
Ravenna F.C. players
Empoli F.C. players
A.C. Milan players
ACF Fiorentina players
U.C. Sampdoria players
Genoa C.F.C. players
U.S. Lecce players
Spezia Calcio players
Footballers from Emilia-Romagna
Sportspeople from the Province of Forlì-Cesena